Geraldo Theodoro Pereira, known as Geraldo Pereira, (Juiz de Fora, April 23, 1918 – Rio de Janeiro, May 8, 1955) was a Brazilian singer and samba composer. He was a major figure in the development of samba in Rio de Janeiro.

References 

Brazilian composers
Samba musicians
1918 births
1955 deaths
People from Juiz de Fora